Steatohepatitis is a type of fatty liver disease, characterized by inflammation of the liver with concurrent fat accumulation in liver. Mere deposition of fat in the liver is termed steatosis, and together these constitute fatty liver changes.

There are two main types of fatty liver disease: alcohol-related fatty liver disease and non-alcoholic fatty liver disease (NAFLD). Risk factors for NAFLD include diabetes, obesity and metabolic syndrome. When inflammation is present it is referred to as alcoholic steatohepatitis and nonalcoholic steatohepatitis (NASH). Steatohepatitis of either cause may progress to cirrhosis, and NASH is now believed to be a frequent cause of unexplained cirrhosis (at least in Western societies). NASH is also associated with lysosomal acid lipase deficiency.

The word is from steato-, meaning "fat" and hepatitis, meaning "inflammation of the liver".

Alcoholic steatohepatitis

Chronic alcohol intake commonly causes steatohepatitis.

Non-alcoholic steatohepatitis (NASH)

Non-alcoholic steatohepatitis is fatty liver disease due to causes other than alcohol. No pharmacological treatment has received approval as of 2015 for NASH. Some studies suggest diet, exercise, and antiglycemic drugs may alter the course of the disease. General recommendations include improving metabolic risk factors and reducing alcohol intake. NASH was first described in 1980 in a series of patients of the Mayo Clinic. Its relevance and high prevalence were recognized mainly in the 1990s. Some think NASH is a diagnosis of exclusion, and many cases may in fact be due to other causes.

See also
 Chronic liver disease
 Steatosis
 Aramchol
 Elafibranor

References

External links 

Hepatitis
Diseases of liver

pt:Esteato-hepatite não alcoólica